The Three-Legged Hootch Dancer is a novel by Mike Resnick published in 1983.

Plot summary
The Three-Legged Hootch Dancer is a novel in which a carnival owner blackmails a company into playing on the interstellar circuit.

Reception
Greg Costikyan reviewed The Three-Legged Hootch Dancer in Ares Magazine #14 and commented that "The intrusion of a human scale into a genre whose major appeal is its galactic scale is a tricky task to pull off, and few have done it successfully. Mike Resnick is one such writer."

Reviews
Review by Tom Easton (1983) in Analog Science Fiction/Science Fact, September 1983

References

1983 American novels
American science fiction novels
Signet Books books